Strange Stories was a pulp magazine which ran for thirteen issues from 1939 to 1941.  It was edited by Mort Weisinger, who was not credited.  Contributors included Robert Bloch, Eric Frank Russell, C. L. Moore, August Derleth, and Henry Kuttner.  Strange Stories was a competitor to the established leader in weird fiction, Weird Tales.  With the launch, also in 1939, of the well-received Unknown, Strange Stories was unable to compete.  It ceased publication in 1941 when Weisinger left to edit Superman comic books.

Publication history and contents 
Fantasy and occult fiction had often appeared in popular magazines before the twentieth century, but the first American magazine to specialize in the genre, Weird Tales, appeared in 1923 and by the 1930s was the genre's industry leader.  In 1939, two magazines were launched in the same niche: one was Unknown, from Street & Smith; the other was Strange Stories, published by Standard Magazines and edited by Mort Weisinger, who was already editing Thrilling Wonder Stories and Startling Stories for Standard.  Weisinger obtained stories from many authors who contributed to Weird Tales, including August Derleth, Henry Kuttner, and Robert Bloch, who between them accounted for 40 of the 148 stories the magazine printed over its thirteen issues.  Critics consider little of the fiction memorable.  Among the better-received stories were two by Kuttner: "Cursed be the City" and "The Citadel of Darkness" in the April and August 1939 issues respectively; "Logoda's Heads", by Derleth, which science fiction historian Robert Weinberg described as "perhaps Derleth's best weird fantasy for any magazine"; and some stories by Manly Wade Wellman in the early issues.  Other contributors included Eric Frank Russell, C. L. Moore, and Seabury Quinn.  There were no serialized novels; at the time, Standard's policy forbade them.  Weinberg described the covers by Standard's in-house artists, Rudolph Belarski and Earle K. Bergey, as "among the worst ever seen on any pulp".   The magazine was an attempt to imitate Weird Tales, but Weisinger was never able to give it any distinctive character of its own.  It received little assistance from its sister magazines in Standard's publishing stable; typically each magazine carried advertisements for other Standard publications, but Startling Stories and Thrilling Wonder Stories rarely mentioned Strange Stories in this way.

Weisinger left Standard Magazines in 1941 to edit Superman comics, and Leo Margulies, the editorial director at Standard, was not interested in continuing the magazine.  The final issue was dated February 1941.  Some of the stories purchased for Strange Stories but left unpublished later appeared in the other Standard magazines, including "The Road to Yesterday", by Kuttner, which appeared in the August 1941 issue of Thrilling Adventure, and "I Married a Ghost", by Seabury Quinn, which was published in Thrilling Mystery in July 1941.

Bibliographic details

The thirteen issues of Strange Stories were in pulp format.  They were 128 pages long and priced at 15 cents until June 1940, after which the page count went down to 96 and the price was reduced to 10 cents.  The editor was Mort Weisinger, who was not credited.  The publisher was Better Publications, a subsidiary of Standard Magazines of New York.  Strange Stories stayed on a bimonthly schedule throughout its run.  There were three issues to a volume, except the final volume which had only one.

References

Sources

Defunct science fiction magazines published in the United States
Fantasy fiction magazines
Pulp magazines
Magazines established in 1939
Magazines disestablished in 1941
Science fiction magazines established in the 1930s
Magazines published in New York (state)